Below is a list of Apple's collection of professional multimedia applications, marketed as pro apps.

Current apps

Music 
Logic Pro, a digital audio workstation for professional music production
MainStage, a companion app to Logic Pro for live music performances

Video 
Compressor, a video and audio encoding tool
Final Cut Pro, a non-linear professional video editing app
Motion, a motion graphics, titling, and compositing app

Apple Inc. software

Discontinued apps

Music 

Apple Loops Utility, a Loops organizer and manager
Logic Studio, a suite of professional music production applications, which included Logic Pro
Soundtrack Pro, a post-production app to create film soundtracks
WaveBurner, an app for CD authoring

Photo 

 Aperture, a professional digital photography management and post-production application

Video 

Apple Qmaster, a distributed visual effects processing tool
Apple Qadministrator, used to create and manage clusters of Qmaster jobs
Batch Monitor, a tool to view and monitor batch encoding tasks
Cinema Tools, a database for film conforming
DVD Studio Pro, a tool for DVD authoring
Final Cut Studio, a suite of professional video editing applications, which included Final Cut Pro
LiveType, a title animation utility
QuickTime Pro, an enhanced version of QuickTime featuring more advanced tools and some export tools
Shake, an digital compositing package used in the movie post-production industry